Dontez Byrd (born August 9, 1995) is an American football wide receiver who is a free agent. He played college football at the University of Louisville and Tennessee Tech University. He was signed by the Atlanta Falcons as an undrafted free agent after the 2018 NFL Draft.

College career

Louisville 
Byrd graduated from Ballard High School in Louisville, Kentucky, with zero scholarship offers to play collegiate football. Byrd was a walk-on at the University of Louisville and played 23 games at Louisville between 2013 and 2015 where mostly played special teams.

Tennessee Tech 
Byrd transferred from Louisville to Tennessee Tech on February 4, 2016. Byrd played 22 games at Tennessee Tech and hauled in 152 catches for 1,936 receiving yards and 13 touchdowns between 2016 and 2017.

Professional career

Atlanta Falcons 
Byrd signed with the Atlanta Falcons as an undrafted free agent on April 18, 2018. He was released on September 1, 2018.

Memphis Express 
Prior to the inaugural Alliance of American Football Season, Byrd signed with the Memphis Express. Byrd played six game for Memphis and had 10 catches for 136 receiving and one touchdown. The AAF ceased operations on April 2, 2019, with all player contracts being terminated with two scheduled games left in the season.

Seattle Dragons 
On January 14, 2020, Byrd signed with the Seattle Dragons of the XFL. Byrd played five games for Seattle and had five catches for 44 yards. The XFL cancelled the rest of the 2020 Season with five scheduled games left due to the COVID-19 pandemic and later suspended league operations and terminated staff and player contracts.

Hamilton Tiger-Cats 
Byrd signed with the Hamilton Tiger-Cats of the CFL on April 19, 2020. After the 2020 CFL season was cancelled, Byrd opted out of his contract on August 31, 2020. Byrd was re-signed on December 10, 2020, and was released June 23, 2021.

Massachusetts Pirates 
Byrd signed with the Massachusetts Pirates of the IFL on June 29, 2021. Byrd played 10 games for the Pirates and had 20 catches for 262 yards and three touchdowns. Byrd helped lead the Pirate to their first ever IFL United Bowl championship win, in which he had three catches for 23 yards.

Orlando Guardians 
On November 17, 2022, Byrd was drafted by the Orlando Guardians of the XFL.

References

External links
 Louisville Cardinals bio
 Tennessee Tech Golden Eagles bio

Living people
1995 births
American football wide receivers
Louisville Cardinals football players
Tennessee Tech Golden Eagles football players
Memphis Express (American football) players
Seattle Dragons players
Hamilton Tiger-Cats players
Massachusetts Pirates players
Orlando Guardians players
Players of American football from Kentucky
Sportspeople from Louisville, Kentucky